Jon O'Mahony (born 10 August 1973) is a British music manager and founder of Rebellion Artists, who currently manage Fraser Churchill, Honey Ryder, Dustin Paul, Starlight Theatre and Fat Buddha.

Early years 
Before entering the music industry, O'Mahony had a variety of jobs including working at Drumtech drum school in London, and a stint working as a tennis coach at the Nick Bollettieri Tennis Academy in Florida, where he was also a hitting partner to various up and coming juniors, including the then 12-year-old Anna Kournikova in the early 1990s.

Music career

Ultra 
O'Mahony was the drummer in the band Ultra signed to East West Records (Warner), which was formed alongside James Hearn, James Rose and Michael Harwood who were schoolfriends from Buckinghamshire, England in the mid-1990s.  After they left school they formed various bands, playing under names such as Stepping Stoned, Decade and Suburban Surfers (where they signed to manager Tom Watkins).  After nine months with Watkins, they left him and found a new manager in Tony Gordon, who had masterminded the careers of Culture Club and Curiosity Killed the Cat.  They eventually called themselves Ultra (named after the Depeche Mode album), and the following year Nick Keynes joined as bass player, after being introduced by mutual friend Neil Cowley.  Cowley at the time was the keyboard player for the Brand New Heavies, and more recently performed piano on Adele's 20 million selling album 21.

Chart success 
Their demo tape eventually came to the attention of Ian Stanley (ex-Tears for Fears) and they were signed to Warner's EastWest label by Ian and Max Hole, who was later to become CEO of Universal Music Group.  In 1998, they released their first single, "Say You Do", written by band member Hearn, which reached No. 11 in the UK Singles Chart. Their next single, "Say it Once", charted at No. 16 in the UK as well as hitting the No. 1 spot in several other territories, including Italy and Australia.  Over the next two years they had several singles in the European and Australasian Top 20, and in 1999, their debut album, Ultra, entered the UK Albums Chart at No. 37. Their final single for Warners was "Rescue Me", which charted in the UK at No. 8, the band's only British Top 10 single.

Rider 
Following from Ultra, O'Mahony, Keynes and Harwood formed a new group with a number of different short term vocalists, including Ryan Molloy.  Both Alistair Griffin and James Fox also sung with the band at different times.  In 2002, and with Molloy as lead singer, the band wrote and recorded a song to celebrate the World Cup, called "England Crazy", which they recorded as a one-off project as Rider with Terry Venables. This project was re-signed to their old record label East West, reaching number 46 in the UK chart.  It has since been featured on a number of football-themed compilation albums.

Goldust Productions 
O'Mahony, Harwood and Keynes set up a music production company, Goldust, writing and producing for other artists such as Bryan Adams, Kylie Minogue, Natasha Bedingfield, Gareth Gates, Sarah Whatmore, British Beef and Liberty X.  They also wrote music for film, with title tracks on both the Andy García movie Modigliani and Pathe's The Magic Roundabout, as well as working on various Miramax films including Ella Enchanted, Bobby and Awake.

Management company and recording studios 
O'Mahony is the founder of Rebellion Artists, a music management and publishing collective that discovers, develops and manages the careers of artists, songwriters and record producers.  The Rebellion office is based in LA Sound Studios in West London, which is home to various other producer/writers including Steve Brown, Richard Spiller, Blue Flowers Music, Tom Garrad-Cole, Chris Hewitt and Martyn Corbet.

Discography

References

External links 
 Jon O'Mahony in Discogs
 Jon O'Mahony in LinkedIn
 Interview with Jon O'Mahony, HitQuarters Apr 2009

1973 births
Living people
English drummers
British male drummers
English pop musicians
Ultra (British band) members
English songwriters
English record producers
English audio engineers
English pop pianists
English music managers
21st-century drummers
21st-century British male musicians
British male songwriters